Euphaedra ducarmei is a butterfly in the family Nymphalidae. It is found in the Democratic Republic of the Congo (northern Kivu).

References

Butterflies described in 1977
ducarmei
Endemic fauna of the Democratic Republic of the Congo
Butterflies of Africa